Lelkes is a surname. Notable people with the surname include:

András Lelkes (born 1935), Hungarian gymnast
Mátyás Lelkes (born 1984), Slovak footballer
Péter István Lelkes (born 1949), Israel-USA biophysicist and bioengineer
Péter Lelkes (born 1990), Hungarian footballer
Rozália Lelkes (born 1950), Hungarian handball player and coach